Olkhovy Volcanic Group is a volcanic group  located in the southern part of Kamchatka Peninsula, Russia. The group includes the shield volcano Olkhovy and the volcanic cone Plosky.

See also
List of volcanoes in Russia

References
Global Volcanism Program

Volcanoes of the Kamchatka Peninsula
Volcanic groups